is a junction passenger railway station located in the city of Sakado, Saitama, Japan, operated by the private railway operator Tōbu Railway.

Lines

Services
All services, (TJ Liner, Rapid Express, Rapid, Express, Semi express, Local) stop at this station. During the daytime, the station is served by eight trains per hour in each direction on the Tojo Line, and by four trains per hour to Ogose on the Ogose Line.

Station layout

The station consists of two sets of island platforms numbered from south to north. From 2010, a new elevated station building provided a central set of ticket gates, replacing the previous exits on the north and south sides.

This station has a season ticket sales office.

A siding on the north side of the station is used for storing track maintenance machines. A stabling track for Ogose Line trains lies to the east of the station, next to the permanent way depot. This was created in 2008.

Platforms

The Ogose Line platforms (1 and 2) are 4 cars long, and the Tojo Line platforms (3 and 4) are 10 cars long.

Adjacent stations

History
The station first opened on 27 October 1916, named , coinciding with the extension of the Tojo Railway from Kawagoe. At the time of opening, the journey time from Ikebukuro was approximately 1 hour 40 minutes (compared to 45 minutes by express in 2008). The Ogose Line was extended from Morido to Ogose on 16 December 1934, from which date passenger service commenced.

From the 1920s, a track continued due westward to the Komagawa River for transporting gravel. This operated until the 1960s. The track maintenance storage track stub to the west of the station, between the Tojo Line and Ogose Line tracks is the truncated remainder of this former line.

The station was renamed Sakado on 1 September 1976 when Sakado became a city. In 1986, the locomotive depot at the east end of the station was closed, although the sheds remain to this day, used as a track maintenance depot.

Mirrors and platform edge sensors were added to the Ogose Line platforms in 2008 ahead of the start of driver-only operation from June 2008.

Work started in 2009 to rebuild the station with an elevated concourse providing a link between the north and south sides of the station. Rebuilding was completed in April 2011.

From 17 March 2012, station numbering was introduced on the Tōbu Tōjō Line, with Sakado Station becoming "TJ-26".

Passenger statistics
In fiscal 2019, the station was used by an average of 29,107 passengers daily. 
 Passenger figures for previous years are as shown below.

Surrounding area

 Sakado City Office
 Nishi-Iruma Police Station
 Sakado Central Library

Education
 Yamamura International High School
 Asahano Junior High School
 Sakado School for the Deaf

Hotels
 Sakado Hotel
 Hotel Sun Road
 Sakado Grand Hotel

Bus services
The north side of the station is served by the "Sakacchi Bus" (Ōya Line) and "Sakacchi Wagon" (Nissai Line) community minibus services operated by the city of Sakado. The south side is served by the "Sakacchi Bus" (Tsurumai Line) and "Sakacchi Wagon" (Shigaichi Line) community minibus services.

The following long-distance express bus services operate from the south side of the station.

 Narita Airport (via Kawagoe Station), operated jointly by Chiba Kōtsū, Kawagoe Motor Corp, and Tobu Bus West
 Haneda Airport, operated jointly by Kokusai Juo and Airport Transport Service (Limousine Bus)
 Kyoto and Osaka, Wing Liner overnight service operated by Kintetsu Bus

See also
 List of railway stations in Japan
 Sakado Station (Fukuoka) in Fukuoka Prefecture
 Sakado Station (Ibaraki) on the former Kashima Railway Line in Ibaraki Prefecture (closed March 2007)

References

External links

 Sakado Station information (Tobu) 

Railway stations in Saitama Prefecture
Stations of Tobu Railway
Tobu Tojo Main Line
Tobu Ogose Line
Railway stations in Japan opened in 1916
Sakado, Saitama